Cigar etiquette is polite behaviour when smoking a cigar.  For example, in 19th century Havana, it was considered an insult to give another smoker a light from your cigar without first knocking off the ash from the cigar.  Another breach of etiquette was to pass on a cigar to a third-party to light up too - loaned cigars should instead be returned with a polite flourish.

Zino Davidoff 

Rules of cigar etiquette were published in 1967 by Swiss tobacconist Zino Davidoff in his essay entitled "Zino Davidoff's Guide to Cigar Etiquette." The essay calls for cigar aficionados to do such things as smoke the cigar only halfway, let it burn out on its own, never ask another smoker for a light, refrain from smoking while walking, etc. Davidoff dismisses the elaborate rituals of lighting, says that removing or leaving the band are equally correct, and insists that a gentleman never relights a cigar that is more than two-thirds smoked.

Other rules of etiquette

A number of sets of rules of cigar etiquette besides Davidoff's have been compiled and published from time to time.  These include:

New York Times

In a 2005 article in The New York Times, Harry Hurt III suggested four basic rules of cigar etiquette:
 Confine indoor cigar smoking to cigar parlors.
 Don't chain-smoke cigars.
 Don't offend non-smokers with the smell of cigar smoke on your clothes or breath.
 Don't ask, don't tell if it's a Cuban cigar.

Cigar Aficionado

Cigar Aficionado's book Cigar Companion suggests two sets of rules: one when among non-smokers, and another when among cigar smokers.  One should never smoke except where smoking is appreciated, and care should be taken to minimize criticism from non-smokers from the smell of smoke in one's home or on one's clothes.  Among other cigar smokers, it suggests rules governing sharing, cutting, lighting, humidors, women cigar smokers, and gifts.  It concludes with one ironclad rule: never give a prank exploding cigar, and do not associate with anyone who does.

References

Cigars